Kamchatka was an armed auxiliary vessel of the Russian Navy. The ship was launched in 1903. Its short career during the Russo-Japanese War was plagued with unfortunate incidents, which ended in her sinking at the Battle of Tsushima.

Service history
Originally built as a collier, she was converted to a repair ship while still under construction. The Kamchatka entered service in the Russian Baltic Fleet in 1903. Her main features were a large hold and large cranes that made her ideal for the role as a repair ship.

The ship was infamous for its actions during the voyage of the Second Pacific Squadron, where it precipitated the Dogger Bank incident. It also was involved in numerous other incidents including misidentifications of neutral vessels as Japanese torpedo boats and mistakenly firing at the Russian cruiser Aurora. While stopping in Madagascar several ships in the fleet acquired several local predatory animals, Kamchatka being no exception. The ship was lost with all hands when it was sunk in 1905 during the Battle of Tsushima to Japanese shell fire.

The ship is also known in popular media for its habit of transmitting the query "Do you see torpedo boats?" in situations where enemy torpedo boats could not possibly have been present, nevertheless causing panic aboard other ships of her squadron.

References

External links
 "Kamchatka - Guide 151" video on YouTube
 "Dogger Bank - Voyage of the Damned" article on Hullsweb

Steamships of Russia
1903 ships
Shipwrecks in the Sea of Japan
Maritime incidents in 1905
Auxiliary ships of the Russian Navy
Ships of the Imperial Russian Navy
Ships lost with all hands